Valentino Rossi is an Italian nine-time Grand Prix world champion - seven of which are in the premier MotoGP class. Rossi raced for Honda's factory team, Yamaha's factory team and Ducati's factory team. Rossi is also the only road racer to have competed in 400 or more Grands Prix. He has ridden with number 46 his entire career, also when being the title defender. Rossi is one of four riders to have won world championship titles in three different categories, after Mike Hailwood, Phil Read and Marc Márquez.

His 115 Grand Prix victories are the second highest of all time. His most successful circuit are Circuit de Barcelona-Catalunya and TT Circuit Assen where he has won ten times. Rossi's largest margin of victory was at the 2002 Portuguese Grand Prix, and the smallest margin of victory was at the 2001 Australian Grand Prix when he beat Max Biaggi by 0.013 seconds in the race.

Wins
Key:
 No. – Victory number.
 Race – Motorcycle Grand Prix career race start number.
 Grid – Starting position on grid.
 Margin – Margin of victory (min:sec.ms).
  – Rider's Championship winning season.

Number of wins at different Grands Prix

Number of wins at different circuits

See also
 List of Grand Prix motorcycle racing winners
 List of MotoGP rider records

Notes

References 

Valentino Rossi
Grand Prix motorcycle racing riders
Rossi, Valentino